Francisco de Amberes, a painter of Toledo, the cathedral of which he ornamented with his pictures in 1502. From 1508 to 1510 he painted, in conjunction with Juan de Borgoña and Juan de Villoldo, the arabesque chapel, which is still an interesting object.

References
 

Year of birth missing
Year of death missing
16th-century Spanish painters
Spanish male painters
People from Toledo, Spain